Four Sigmatic is a Finnish-American functional foods company. The company is headquartered in Los Angeles, California. Four Sigmatic sells food products which include various coffee products, plant-based proteins, wellness supplements, beauty products, and other so-called superfood products.

History
The company's predecessor LUONTOlife was founded in 2011 by three Finnish entrepreneurs Tero Isokauppila, Mikko Revonniemi and Mika Rantanen. LUONTOlife was based in Hong Kong, and 2012 onwards sold blenders, mushroom elixirs, herbal extracts, and raw honey mostly to European customers under the Four Sigma Foods brand name. In 2014, after Revonniemi and Rantanen stopped working on the business, Isokauppila founded a new US based company Funguys, Inc, which bought LUONTOlife remaining assets. 

In 2015, together with original LUONTOlife employees Mikael Makinen and Markus Karjalainen, the company launched in the U.S. market. Isokauppila, Makinen, and Karjalainen saw an opportunity to bring their Nordic wellness routines to the U.S. market. That same year the company launched its flagship Mushroom Coffee product and moved its headquarters to Santa Monica, CA. Years later, in 2016, the company rebranded as Four Sigmatic. Since then the company’s products have been recognized by Time, Forbes, BuzzFeed, Vogue, Playboy, GQ, Harper’s Bazaar, Bon Appétit and others. In 2018 the company received a round of private funding from investors like AF Ventures, LYRA Growth Partners, Simon Equity Partners, and Able Partners.

As of 2021, the company's products are available in 65 countries. The company’s products are sold online and with retailers Target, Kroger banners, ULTA.

The founder Isokauppila was chosen twice as one of the world’s Top 50 Food Activists by the Academy of Culinary Nutrition and has been an active voice in the American health and wellness industry. In 2017, Isokauppila wrote a book Healing Mushrooms with Avery Publishing, imprint of the Penguin Group. Isokauppila has appeared in many podcasts and given many talks about, including with Google and Fast Company Innovation Festival. Together with his brother, Isokauppila still operates a 13th generation family farm which their family has had since 1619.

Business
The company is headquartered in Los Angeles, California. Four Sigmatic sells more than 30 functional food products which include various coffee products, plant-based proteins, wellness supplements, beauty products, and other so-called superfood products.

References

Food and drink companies of the United States
Food and drink companies established in 2012
Food and drink companies of Finland
Medicinal fungi
Finnish companies established in 2012